The VIM or Vickers Instructional Machine was a trainer biplane aircraft built for the Republic of China by Vickers from war-surplus stocks of Royal Aircraft Factory F.E.2d parts, powered by a surplus Rolls-Royce Eagle engine, but fitted with an entirely new nacelle, providing dual controls for the pupil and instructor. Thirty-five were built and supplied from 1920.

Operators

Specifications (VIM)

References

 Andrews, C.F. and Morgan, E.B. Vickers Aircraft since 1908. London:Putnam, 1988. .
 "The Vickers 'V.I.M.' School Machine." Flight, 6 January 1921, p. 4-5.

1910s British military trainer aircraft
Aircraft first flown in 1920